Natalya Vladimirovna Bochkareva (born July 25, 1980) is a Russian stage and film actress and television presenter.

Biography 
Natalya Vladimirovna Bochkareva was born in Gorky (now Nizhny Novgorod) on July 25, 1980. Both her parents have died - her mother at age 54 from complications after strokes - and her father at age 52 several years later. She has one sibling, younger sister Nadezhda Bochkareva.

She graduated from Nizhny Novgorod Theatre School in 2000 and from Moscow Art Theatre School in 2002.

Career 
She started her career in 1999 when she played a small role in the movie Chinese Service.

From 2006 to 2013, she played the main role of Darya Bukina in the Russian TV series Happy Together - an adaptation of the American TV series Married... with Children.

Since 2002, she has been an actress for the Moscow Art Theatre, and since 2010 she has worked as a television presenter.

In 2018, she appeared in the comedy film Night Shift.

Personal life 
On September 28, 2007, she married lawyer Nikolai Borisov. They have two children, son Ivan Borisov (born on January 4, 2007) and daughter Maria Borisova (born on February 22, 2008). Natalya also has a step-daughter, Alysa Borisova.

References

External links 
 

1980 births
Actors from Nizhny Novgorod
Living people
Russian film actresses
Russian television actresses
Russian television presenters
Russian voice actresses
Russian women television presenters
Moscow Art Theatre School alumni